The Smile International Film Festival for Children & Youth (SIFFCY) is an annual film festival organised in the city of New Delhi, India, by Smile Foundation.

Organizer
Smile Foundation is a national level development organisation which undertakes welfare projects on education, healthcare, livelihood and women empowerment in more than 700 remote villages across 25 states of India. Smile Foundation has already produced more than 60 short films and documentaries beside a feature film titled I am Kalam. The film was screened in the market section at the 63rd Cannes Film Festival on 12 May 2010. It has produced the TV series Choone Do Aasman with NDTV.

Key members
Santanu Mishra (Chairman)
Jitendra Mishra (Festival Director)
Utpal Borpujari (Member)
Saibal Chatterjee (Member)
Ashok Rane (Member)
Jahnu Barua (Adviser)
Hansal Mehta (Adviser)
Tigmanshu Dhulia (Adviser)
Nagesh Kukunoor (Adviser)
Resul Pookutty (Adviser)
Santosh Sivan (Adviser)

Awards and prizes
Best Film (Feature) 
Best Director (Feature) 
Best Actor / Actress (in Feature) 
Best Story (Feature) 
Best Film (Short) 
Best Documentary (Documentary) 
Best Student film (Special Citation in 3 different age group) 
Best film with special message (Special Citation in any category) 
Certificate of Participation to all films presented in this section.

Film Festivals
The third edition of the International Smile Film Festival for Children and Adolescents (SIFFCY) opened on December 11 with the presence of actor Raveena Tandon and Shantanu Mishra, Executive Director of the Smile Foundation and President - SIFFCY and Jitendra Mishra. Director - Seifi.

References

External links
 Official website
 Smile Foundation official website

Festivals in Delhi
Film festivals in India